The Nude Restaurant, also billed as Nude Restaurant, is a 1967 feature-length underground film directed by Andy Warhol, and starring Viva, Louis Waldon, Taylor Mead, Billy Name, Allen Midgette, and Rolando Peña. Different versions of the film exist, with one being an all-male, all-nude cast, and the other with all actors in G-strings. It was filmed in one day at the Mad Hatter Restaurant in Manhattan in October 1967.

Plot synopsis
At The Mad Hatter, a New York City restaurant located on the corner of Bleecker Street and Seventh Avenue South and owned by brothers Rob Pinon and Ron Pinon, the patrons are men, nude but for a G-string, waited on by one woman, also clad in a G-string (Viva) and waiters (Midgette and Peña). Some of the "nude" patrons leave the establishment, their places taken by new customers, also nearly in the buff.

There are numerous in-camera jump cuts (known as 'strobe cuts') and the camera weaves around a bit. The waiter and waitress move from table to table, talking to the customers. Taylor Mead sits smirking at the fountain, where eventually he partakes in a long conversation with Viva about her Catholic childhood. Mead also feigns interest in discussing the Vietnam War with an AWOL soldier (Julian Burroughs).

Viva, the waitress if not the actual person, seemingly is obsessed with the subject of lascivious priests. There is more strobe cutting, and at one point, Viva turns to the camera and asks that it be turned off. The camera is turned off, and after an interlude, is turned back on again, after which Viva continues with her monologue.

See also
Andy Warhol filmography

References

External links
 
The Nude Restaurant at WarholStars
The Nude Restaurant at TCM Database

1967 films
Films directed by Andy Warhol
1960s English-language films
1960s American films